Harry Blount may refer to:

Sir Harry Blount, 3rd Baronet (1702–1757) of the Blount baronets
Harry Blount, fictional character in Vernes' Michael Strogoff

See also
Henry Blount (disambiguation)
Blount (surname)